Ross High RFC is a rugby union club based in Tranent, Scotland.

History

The club was founded in 1970. The club, as its name suggests, grew out of the desire of the former pupils of Ross High School in Tranent to form a rugby union club. The first President of the club Bill Monteith was headmaster of the High School.

The club's longest serving president was Scott Glynn, who was given a MBE for his charity work. Glynn died on 1 January 2020.

A book was released Mon the Ross detailing the history of the club.

Ross High RFC has a long-standing partnership with Welsh rugby union club Markham RFC near Caerphilly.

Sides

The club runs senior and under 18s training on Tuesday and Thursday nights from 7pm to 8.30pm. It is noted as for 'boys and girls from 8 to 80'.

Honours

Mens

 Holy Cross Sevens
 Champions (1): 1993
 Broughton Sevens
 Champions (1): 2006
 North Berwick Sevens
 Champions (2): 1995, 1996
 Lenzie Sevens
 Champions: 1996

References

Rugby union in East Lothian
Scottish rugby union teams